= Campeche, Mexico =

Campeche, Mexico, may refer to:

- Campeche, one of the 32 component federal entities of the United Mexican States.
- Campeche, Campeche, capital city of that state.
